The Woodstock Railway was an intrastate railroad in southeastern Vermont.

History
The legislature of Vermont granted a charter to construct the railroad in 1863, but little was done until 1867, when enough money was raised to begin construction.  Construction began in earnest in 1868, and proceeded fitfully until 1875, when the line was finally completed and the first train made the trip.  While never very busy, the line continued running until 1933, when it was abandoned. The last run took place on Saturday, April 15, 1933.

Originally the Woodstock Railroad, a financial reorganization in 1890 caused the name to change to Woodstock Railway.

Stations
An 1877 timetable listed the following stops from east to west:

White River Junction, Vermont - interchange with the Central Vermont Railway
Hartford, Vermont
Dewey's Mills, Vermont
Quechee, Vermont
Taftsville, Vermont
Woodstock, Vermont

See Also
 Frederick H. Billings
 Franklin Noble Billings
 F. H. Gillingham & Sons

References
 Jones, Robert C., Railroads of Vermont, Volume II, 1993.
 Mead, Edgar T.,  Over the Hills to Woodstock, 1967.

Archives and records
Woodstock Railroad Company records at Baker Library Special Collections, Harvard Business School.

Defunct Vermont railroads